SS Metagama was a transatlantic ocean liner That was launched in 1914 and scrapped in 1934. The Canadian Pacific Railway Co owned her and the Canadian Pacific Steamship Co operated her. She was a pioneering example of a "cabin class" passenger ship.

Building
Before the First World War, Canadian Pacific ordered a pair of liners from Barclay, Curle & Co on the River Clyde in Glasgow, Scotland. Canadian Pacific planned the pair to pioneer a new concept in passenger accommodation, in which there was no first class or second class but instead a single "cabin class".

Barclay, Curle built Missanabie and Metagama as yard numbers 510 and 511. Missanabie was launched on 22 June 1914 and Metagama on 19 November. Metagama was completed in March 1915. Her holds had  of refrigerated space for perishable cargo.

Metagama had twin screws, each driven by a four-cylinder quadruple expansion engine.

Canadian Pacific registered Metagama at London. Her UK official number was 134791 and her code letters were JKDF.

Career
Missanabie served in the First World War as troop ships. A U-boat sank her in 1918 with the loss of 45 lives.

Metagama remained in civilian passenger service, although her passengers often included troops. Her first regular route was between Liverpool and St John, New Brunswick. She sometimes served Glasgow, and from 1927 her route was between Antwerp and Montreal.

Metagama was involved in two collisions. The first was on 26 May 1923, when she collided with Hogarth Line's cargo steamship Baron Vernon in the River Clyde.

In June 1924 Metagama was westbound to Montreal when the Italian steamship Clara Camus collided with her about seven miles off Cape Race, Newfoundland. Clara Camus bow made a hole  in the Matagamas port side. Metagama launched a lifeboat crewed by three crewmen to inspect the damage, but in the fog the boat drifted away from the ship and disappeared. The United States Coast Guard Cutter  later found the boat, but its three occupants were missing. Metagama was towed into port and her 695 passengers were transferred to another CP liner, Montreal, on which they completed their journey to Montreal.

By 1924 Metagamas navigation equipment included wireless direction finding. By 1930 her wireless telegraph call sign was GMLQ.

The Great Depression that began in 1929 led to a global slump in merchant shipping. From 1931 Metagama was laid up at Southend-on-Sea in England. On 13 April 1934 she arrived at Bo'ness on the Firth of Forth, where P&W MacLellan scrapped her.

References

Bibliography

1914 ships
Maritime incidents in 1923
Maritime incidents in 1924
Ocean liners
Passenger ships of the United Kingdom
Ships built in Glasgow
Steamships of the United Kingdom
World War I passenger ships of the United Kingdom